Wanli District was an urban district of the prefecture-level city of Nanchang, the capital of Jiangxi Province, China. More than 70% is forest-covered, and the majority of the economy is natural resource based, with forestry and Chinese medicinal herbs predominating.

In December 2019, Wanli was merged into neighboring Xinjian District.

Administrative divisions
It is divided into 2 sub-districts, 3 towns, and 1 township.

Sub-districts
Zhanqian
Xinfu

Towns
Zhaoxian
Meiling
Luoting

Township
Taiping

References

External links
Nanchang Wanli District Government Web(Chinese)

Nanchang
County-level divisions of Jiangxi
2019 disestablishments in China